Loporzano is a municipality in the province of Huesca, Spain. As of 2010, it has a population of 540 inhabitants.

Geography 
Villages: Aguas, La Almunia del Romeral, Ayera, Bandaliés, Barluenga, Castilsabás, Coscullano, Chibluco, Loscertales, Los Molinos, San Julián de Banzo, Santa Eulalia la Mayor, Sasa del Abadiado, Sipán and Vadiello.

External links 

Municipalities in the Province of Huesca